Pentacora is a genus of shore bugs in the family Saldidae. There are about 12 described species in Pentacora.

Species
These 12 species belong to the genus Pentacora:

 Pentacora grossi Cobben, 1980
 Pentacora hirta (Say, 1832)
 Pentacora leucographa Rimes, 1951
 Pentacora ligata (Say, 1832)
 Pentacora malayensis (Dover, 1929)
 Pentacora ouachita J. Polhemus, 1993
 Pentacora salina (Bergroth, 1893)
 Pentacora saratogae Cobben, 1965
 Pentacora signoreti (Guérin-Méneville, 1857)
 Pentacora sonneveldti Blöte, 1947
 Pentacora spacelata (Uhler, 1877)
 Pentacora sphacelata (Uhler, 1877)

References

Further reading

External links

 

Articles created by Qbugbot
Heteroptera genera
Chiloxanthinae